Hyssna is a locality situated in Mark Municipality, Västra Götaland County, Sweden. It had 728 inhabitants in 2019.

Sports
The following sports clubs are located in Hyssna:

 Hyssna IF

References 

Populated places in Västra Götaland County
Populated places in Mark Municipality